The 1923–24 season was Galatasaray SK's 20th in existence and the club's 14th consecutive season in the Istanbul Football League.

Squad statistics

Competitions

İstanbul Football League

Semifinals

Final

Group matches
Kick-off listed in local time (EEST)

Knockout phase
Kick-off listed in local time (EEST)

Friendly matches

References
 Futbol, Galatasaray. Tercüman Spor Ansiklopedisi vol.2 (1981) page (559-560)
 1923-1924 İstanbul Futbol Ligi. Türk Futbol Tarihi vol.1. page(45). (June 1992) Türkiye Futbol Federasyonu Yayınları.
 Atabeyoğlu, Cem. 1453-1991 Türk Spor Tarihi Ansiklopedisi. page(88, 93).(1991) An Grafik Basın Sanayi ve Ticaret AŞ.
 Tekil, Süleyman. Dünden bugüne Galatasaray(1983). Page(173-174). Arset Matbaacılık Kol.Şti.

External links
 Galatasaray Sports Club Official Website 
 Turkish Football Federation - Galatasaray A.Ş. 
 uefa.com - Galatasaray AŞ

Galatasaray S.K. (football) seasons
Turkish football clubs 1923–24 season
1920s in Istanbul